Harpograptis is a genus of moth in the family Cosmopterigidae. It contains only one species, Harpograptis eucharacta, which is found in Brazil.

References

External links
Natural History Museum Lepidoptera genus database

Cosmopterigidae
Monotypic moth genera